The Russo-Swedish War of 1495–1497, known in Sweden as the Stures' Russian War was a border war which occurred between the Grand Duchy of Moscow and the Kingdom of Sweden. Although the war was relatively short, and did not lead to any territorial changes, it has significance as the first war between Sweden and Moscow, following the Muscovite annexation of the Republic of Novgorod two decades previously. As the Grand Duchy of Moscow would later become the Tsardom of Russia and ultimately the Russian Empire, the 1495-7 war is usually considered to be the first Russo-Swedish War, as opposed to the various Swedish-Novgorodian Wars which had occurred earlier in the Middle Ages.

Background

The Österland Border
During the High Middle Ages, the Kingdom of Sweden had expanded across the Baltic Sea and conquered the entirety of what is now Finland (referred to by the Swedes as Österland), and thereby came into contact with the Republic of Novgorod. The border between Sweden and the Republic of Novgorod was fixed by the 1322 Treaty of Nöteborg, which defined it as beginning at Vyborg Castle on the Gulf of Finland and then running north, up the middle of the Karelian Isthmus and across Savonia to terminate at the Gulf of Bothnia, probably in the area of the Pyhäjoki River, although the treaty is rather vague with regard to the northern segment of the border, presumably because this territory was initially considered to be useless wasteland.

Despite the signing of the Treaty, conflicts recurred periodically between Sweden and Novgorod through the fourteenth and fifteenth centuries. The Novgorodians were aggrieved by Swedish settlement on their side of the border, particularly in northern Ostrobothnia and eastern Savonia; the building of a Swedish castle at Olavinlinna in 1475 was especially provocative.

However, Novgorod was not in a position to seek redress for its grievances as the Republic was by then in terminal decline. In 1472 it was defeated by its southeastern neighbour, the Grand Duchy of Moscow, and forced to accept vassal status, and in 1478 Grand Prince Ivan III formally dissolved the Republic and annexed Novgorod to Moscow.

Sweden and the Kalmar Union
In 1397 Sweden had, together with the Kingdoms of Denmark and Norway, formed the tripartite union known as the Kalmar Union. However, by the late fifteenth century its position in the Union had been thrown into question. From 1471 it was ruled by a regent, Sten Sture the Elder and was de facto independent, but theoretically it was still part of the Union, a large proportion of its political class favoured close ties with Denmark-Norway. Successive Danish-Norwegian kings encouraged this unionist sentiment to try to force Sten to acknowledge royal sovereignty and to re-integrate Sweden fully into the Union.

In 1493, King Hans attempted to put further pressure on Sten by concluding an alliance with Grand Prince Ivan, promising that if he managed to take control of Sweden he would restore the Russo-Swedish border to the line stipulated by the Treaty of Nöteborg. Sten thus found himself menaced by hostile powers to both east and west.

For his part, Ivan did not entirely trust the promise of territorial concessions from Hans. Calculating that the Swedes would be too preoccupied with the threat of a Danish-Norwegian invasion to deal with a Muscovite incursion into Österland, he decided to seize the vital Swedish border fortress at Vyborg and thus present both the Swedes and Danes with a fait accompli.

War
In late 1495, Ivan sent Princes Daniil Shchenya and Vasily Shuisky to lay siege to the Swedish castle of Viborg, whose commander Knut Jönsson Posse happened to be married to one of Sten Sture's cousins. After a siege of three months, the Muscovites attempted to storm the castle in late November, but a massive explosion killed a large number of the attackers and stopped the assault in its tracks, and the siege was lifted soon afterward. The explosion went down in Swedish and Finnish folklore as 'the Vyborg Bang'. 

The Muscovites subsequently switched tactics, and rather than trying to seize Swedish castles they instead attempted to force them into submission by ravaging Österland. Over the winter of 1495-6 Muscovite forces under Vasily Kosoy and Andrey Chelyadnin devastated the country around Tavastehus, while other Muscovite raiding parties managed to get all the way to the gates of Åbo, which was a major humiliation for Sten.

The Swedish regent responded by declaring the conflict to be a holy war, as the Muscovites, being Orthodox Christians, were considered heretics by the Catholic Swedes. In summer 1496 he succeeded in getting Pope Alexander VI to issue a papal bull officially recognising the war as a crusade against heretics, which was a propaganda boost for Sten and enabled him to impose extra taxes to fund the war effort. These taxes were however very unpopular in Sweden, especially for the Swedish Church, which was already suspicious of Sten for his efforts to encroach upon its traditional freedoms and blamed him for the outbreak of the war with Moscow. 

In August a Swedish force under the command of Svante Nilsson sailed across the Gulf of Finland to attack Ivangorod, a castle which Ivan III had built to protect Ingria against the Livonian Order in what is now Estonia and Latvia. The castle was successfully captured and razed, whereupon Svante returned to Åbo to await reinforcements from Sweden.

Sten Sture himself arrived in Österland in early autumn 1496 with a fresh army, planning to overwinter at Åbo and then mount a campaign into Ingria in 1497. However, upon arrival he fell out with Svante Nilsson, who promptly sailed to Sweden and aligned himself with the unionist opposition against Sten. Given Svante's status as the general who had captured Ivangorod, this defection was a major blow to Sten, and in November he was forced to return to Sweden himself to address the gathering unrest against him. He also offered to make peace with Moscow, and a six-year truce was agreed in March 1497, bringing the war to an end.

Trivia
The conflict is known in Sweden as the Stures' Russian War after Sten Sture the Elder and Svante Nilsson. Confusingly, Svante Nilsson actually belonged to the Natt och Dag family rather than the Sture family, but he was distantly related to Sten, and moreover his son Sten Svantesson later adopted the surname Sture (and is therefore known as Sten Sture the Younger), and so Svante is often described as a Sture himself.

References

Sources
 Palme, Sven Ulric, Sten Sture den äldre, AB Wahlström & Widstrand 1950, Stockholm
 Suvanto, S: Suomen poliittinen asema Sten Sturen vanhemman valtakautena vuosina 1483–1497 (Finlands politiska ställning under Sten Sture den äldres regering 1483–1497), Suomen historiallinen seura 1952, Helsinki
 Jaakkola, J: Suomen myöhäiskeskiaika II (Finlands senmedeltid), Werner Söderström OY 1959
 Suomen kansan historia I (Det finska folkets historia), Otava 1964, Helsinki
 Julku, K: Suomen itärajan synty (Den finska östgränsens tillkomst), Pohjoissuomen historiallinen yhdistys 1987, Rovaniemi
 Finlands historia I, Schildts Förlags AB 1992, Esbo
 Harrison, D: Gud vill det! Nordiska korsfarare under medeltiden, Ordfront förlag 2005, Stockholm
 Sveriges historia 1350–1600, Norstedts 2010, Stockholm

15th century in Finland
Wars involving Russia
Wars involving Sweden
History of the Karelian Isthmus
1490s conflicts
Russia–Sweden military relations
15th century in Sweden
15th-century military history of Russia
Conflicts in 1495
Conflicts in 1496
Conflicts in 1497
1495 in Europe
1496 in Europe
1497 in Europe
15th century in the Grand Duchy of Moscow